The winners of the 10th Vancouver Film Critics Circle Awards, honoring the best in filmmaking in 2009, were announced on January 11, 2010.

Winners and nominees

International
Best Actor: Colin Firth – A Single Man
George Clooney – Up in the Air
Jeremy Renner – The Hurt Locker
Best Actress: Carey Mulligan – An Education
Gabourey Sidibe – Precious
Meryl Streep – Julie and Julia
Best Director: Kathryn Bigelow – The Hurt Locker
Jason Reitman – Up in the Air
Quentin Tarantino – Inglourious Basterds
Best Film: Up in the Air
A Serious Man
The Hurt Locker
Best Foreign Language Film: Summer Hours • France
Broken Embraces • Spain
The Headless Woman  • Argentina
Best Supporting Actor: Christoph Waltz – Inglourious Basterds
Alfred Molina – An Education
Stanley Tucci – The Lovely Bones
Best Supporting Actress: Vera Farmiga – Up in the Air
Anna Kendrick – Up in the Air
Mo'Nique – Precious
Best Screenplay: Up in the Air - Jason Reitman & Sheldon Turner
The Hurt Locker - Mark Boal
Inglourious Basterds - Quentin Tarantino
Best Documentary: Anvil! The Story of Anvil
The Cove
Food, Inc

Canadian
Best Actor: Xavier Dolan – I Killed My Mother (J'ai tué ma mère)
Sébastien Huberdeau – Polytechnique
Stephen McHattie – Pontypool
Best Actress: Emily Blunt – The Young Victoria
Anne Dorval – I Killed My Mother (J'ai tué ma mère)
Nisreen Faour – Amreeka
Best British Columbia Film: Facing Ali
A Shine of Rainbows
Excited
Best Director: Xavier Dolan – I Killed My Mother (J'ai tué ma mère)
Cherien Dabis – Amreeka
Denis Villeneuve – Polytechnique
Best Film: I Killed My Mother (J'ai tué ma mère)
Polytechnique
The Young Victoria
Best Supporting Actor: François Arnaud – I Killed My Mother (J'ai tué ma mère)
Daniel J. Gordon – Nurse.Fighter.Boy
John Paul Tremblay – Trailer Park Boys: Countdown to Liquor Day
Best Supporting Actress: Gabrielle Rose – Excited
Lisa Houle – Pontypool
Miranda Richardson – The Young Victoria

References

2009
2009 film awards
Van
2009 in British Columbia